Thai people (endonym), Central Thai people (exonym and also domestically) or Siamese (historical exonym and sometimes domestically), T(h)ai Noi people (historical endonym and sometimes domestically), in a narrow sense, are a Tai ethnic group dominant in Central and Southern Thailand (Siam proper). Part of the larger Tai ethno-linguistic group native to Southeast Asia as well as Southern China and Northeast India, Thais speak the Sukhothai languages (Central Thai and Southern Thai language), which is classified as part of the Kra–Dai family of languages. The majority of Thais are followers of Theravada Buddhism.

However, only the Kra–Dai-speaking population in northern Thailand strongly shares genetic profiles with the Tai people in southern China; the population of the northeastern region is related to both Tai people and Austroasiatic-speaking ethnic groups in Laos and Cambodia, while the central and southern groups are more genetically related to Mon people in Myanmar.

As a result of government policy during the 1930s and 1940s resulting in successful forced assimilation of many the various ethno-linguistic groups in the country into the dominant Central Thai language and culture, the term Thai people has come to refer to the population of Thailand in general. This includes other subgroups of the Tai ethno-linguistic group, such as the Yuan people and the Isan people, as well as non-Tai groups, the largest of which is that of the Chinese, who form a substantial minority ethnic group in Thailand.

Etymology 

According to Michel Ferlus, the ethnonyms Thai/Tai (or Thay/Tay) would have evolved from the etymon *k(ə)ri: 'human being' through the following chain: *kəri: > *kəli: > *kədi:/*kədaj > *di:/*daj > *dajA (Proto-Southwestern Tai) > tʰajA2 (in Siamese and Lao) or > tajA2 (in the other Southwestern and Central Tai languages classified by Li Fangkuei). Michel Ferlus' work is based on some simple rules of phonetic change observable in the Sinosphere and studied for the most part by William H. Baxter (1992).

Michel Ferlus notes that a deeply rooted belief in Thailand has it that the term "Thai" derives from the last syllables -daya in Sukhodaya/ Sukhothay (สุโขทัย), the name of the first Thai Kingdom. The spelling emphasizes this prestigious etymology by writing ไทย (transliterated ai-d-y) to designate the Thai/ Siamese people, while the form ไท (transliterated ai-d) is occasionally used to refer to Tai speaking ethnic groups. Lao writes ໄທ (transliterated ai-d) in both cases.

The French diplomat Simon de la Loubère, mentioned that, "The Siamese give to themselves the Name of Tai, or Free, and those that understand the Language of Pegu, affirm that Siam in that Tongue signifies Free. 'Tis from thence perhaps that the Portugues have derived this word, having probably known the Siamese by the Peguan. Nevertheless Navarete in his Historical Treatises of the Kingdom of China, relates that the Name of Siam, which he writes Sian, comes from these two words Sien lo, without adding their signification, or of what Language they are; altho' it may be presumed he gives them for Chinese, Meuang Tai is therefore the Siamese Name of the Kingdom of Siam (for Meuang signifies Kingdom) and this word wrote simply Muantay, is found in Vincent le Blanc, and in several Geographical Maps, as the Name of a Kingdom adjoining to Pegu: But Vincent le Blanc apprehended not that this was the Kingdom of Siam, not imagining perhaps that Siam and Tai were two different Names of the same People. In a word, the Siamese, of whom I treat, do call themselves Tai Noe, *little Siams. There are others, as I was informed, altogether savage, which are called Tai yai, great Siams, and which do live in the Northern Mountains."

Based on a Chinese source, the Ming Shilu, Zhao Bo-luo-ju, described as "the heir to the old Ming-tai prince of the country of Xian-luo-hu", sent an envoy to China in 1375. Geoff Wade suggested that Ming Tai might represent the word "Muang Tai" while the word Jiu means old.

History 

There have been many theories proposing the origin of the Tai peoples — of which the Thai are a subgroup — including an association of the Tai people with the Kingdom of Nanzhao that has been proven to be invalid. A linguistic study has suggested that the origin of the Tai people may lie around Guangxi Zhuang Autonomous Region of southern China, where the Zhuang people currently account for approximately one third of the total population. The Qin dynasty founded Guangdong in 214 BC, initiating the successive waves of Han Chinese migrations from the north for hundreds of years to come.

With the political and cultural pressures from the north, some Tai peoples migrated south where they met the classical Indianized civilizations of Southeast Asia. According to linguistic and other historical evidence, the southwestward migration of Southwestern Tai-speaking tribes, in particular, from Guangxi took place sometime between the 8th-10th centuries.

The Tais from the north gradually settled in the Chao Phraya valley from the tenth century onwards, in lands of the Dvaravati culture, assimilating the earlier Austroasiatic Mon and Khmer people, as well as coming into contact with the Khmer Empire. The Tais who came to the area of present-day Thailand were engulfed into the Theravada Buddhism of the Mon and the Hindu-Khmer culture and statecraft. Therefore, the Thai culture is a mixture of Tai traditions with Indic, Mon, and Khmer influences.

Early Thai chiefdoms included the Sukhothai Kingdom and Suphan Buri Province. The Lavo Kingdom, which was the center of Khmer culture in Chao Phraya valley, was also the rallying point for the Thais. The Thai were called "Siam" by the Angkorians and they appeared on the bas relief at Angkor Wat as a part of the army of Lavo Kingdom. Sometimes the Thai chiefdoms in the Chao Phraya valley were put under the Angkorian control under strong monarchs (including Suryavarman II and Jayavarman VII) but they were mostly independent.

A new city-state known as Ayutthaya Covering the areas of central and southern Thailand, named after the Indian city of Ayodhya, was founded by Ramathibodi and emerged as the center of the growing Thai empire starting in 1350. Inspired by the then Hindu-based Khmer Empire, the Ayutthayan empire's continued conquests led to more Thai settlements as the Khmer empire weakened after their defeat at Angkor in 1431. During this period, the Ayutthayans developed a feudal system as various vassal states paid homage to the Ayutthayans kings. Even as Thai power expanded at the expense of the Mon and Khmer, the Thai Ayutthayans faced setbacks at the hands of the Malays at Malacca and were checked by the Toungoo of Burma.

Though sporadic wars continued with the Burmese and other neighbors, Chinese wars with Burma and European intervention elsewhere in Southeast Asia allowed the Thais to develop an independent course by trading with the Europeans as well as playing the major powers against each other in order to remain independent. The Chakkri dynasty under Rama I held the Burmese at bay, while Rama II and Rama III helped to shape much of Thai society, but also led to Thai setbacks as the Europeans moved into areas surrounding modern Thailand and curtailed any claims the Thai had over Cambodia, in dispute with Burma and Vietnam. The Thai learned from European traders and diplomats, while maintaining an independent course. Chinese, Malay, and British influences helped to further shape the Thai people who often assimilated foreign ideas, but managed to preserve much of their culture and resisted the European colonization that engulfed their neighbors. Thailand is also the only country in Southeast Asia that was not colonized by European powers in modern history.

The concept of a Thai nation was not developed until the beginning of the 20th century, under Prince Damrong and then King Rama VI (Vajiravudh). Before this era, Thai did not even have a word for 'nation'. King Rama VI also imposed the idea of "Thai-ness" (khwam-pen-thai) on his subjects and strictly defined what was "Thai" and "un-Thai". Authors of this period re-wrote Thai history from an ethno-nationalist viewpoint, disregarding the fact that the concept of ethnicity had not played an important role in Southeast Asia until the 19th century. This newly developed nationalism was the base of the policy of "Thaification" of Thailand which was intensified after the end of absolute monarchy in 1932 and especially under the rule of Field Marshal Plaek Phibunsongkhram (1938–1944). Minorities were forced to assimilate and the regional differences of northern, northeastern and southern Thailand were repressed in favour of one homogenous "Thai" culture. As a result, many citizens of Thailand cannot differentiate between their nationality (san-chat) and ethnic origin (chuea-chat). It is thus common for descendants of Jek เจ๊ก (Chinese) and Khaek แขก (Indian, Arab, Muslim), after several generations in Thailand, to consider themselves as "chuea-chat Thai" (ethnic Thai) rather than identifying with their ancestors' ethnic identity.

Other peoples living under Thai rule, mainly Mon, Khmer, and Lao, as well as Chinese, Indian or Muslim immigrants continued to be assimilated by Thais, but at the same time they influenced Thai culture, philosophy, economy and politics. In his paper Jek pon Lao (1987) (เจ้กปนลาว—Chinese mixed with Lao), Sujit Wongthet, who describes himself in the paper as a Chinese mixed with Lao (Jek pon Lao), claims that the present-day Thai are really Chinese mixed with Lao. He insinuates that the Thai are no longer a well-defined race but an ethnicity composed of many races and cultures. The biggest and most influential group economically and politically in modern Thailand are the Thai Chinese. Theraphan Luangthongkum, a Thai linguist of Chinese ancestry, claims that 40% of the Thai population are descendants of former Chinese immigrants. A recent study shows that there is a close genetic relationship between central Thai and Mon people in Thailand, who migrated from southern Myanmar.

A genetic study published in 2021 indicated that the present-day Tai-Kadai speaking groups from different geographic regions in Thailand show different genetic relationships; the northern groups are closely related to the ethnic groups in southern China, such as the Dai people, Palaungic Austroasiatic groups, and Austroasiatic-speaking Kinh, as well as the Austronesian-speaking groups from Taiwan; the northeastern groups are genetically close to the Khmu-Katu groups, the Tai-Kadai-speaking Laotians, Khmer, and Dai, while the central and southern groups strongly share genetic profiles with the Mon people in Myanmar, but the southern groups also shown a relationship with the Austronesian-speaking Mamanwa and some ethnic groups in Malaysia and Indonesia.

Geography and demographics 

The vast majority of the Thai people live in Thailand, although some Thais can also be found in other parts of Southeast Asia. About 51–57 million live in Thailand alone, while large communities can also be found in the United States, China, Laos, Taiwan, Malaysia, Singapore, Cambodia, Burma, South Korea, Germany, the United Kingdom, Canada, Australia, Sweden, Norway, Libya, and the United Arab Emirates.

Culture and society 

The Thais can be broken down into various regional groups with their own regional varieties of Thai. These groups include the Central Thai (also the standard variety of the language and Culture), the Southern Thai, the Isan (more closely related to the standard Lao of Laos than to standard Thai), the Lanna Thai, and Yawi/Malay-speaking Thai Malays. Within each regions exist multiple ethnic groups.
Modern Central Thai culture has become more dominant due to official government policy, which was designed to assimilate and unify the disparate Thai in spite of ethnolinguistic and cultural ties between the non-Central-Thai-speaking people and their communities.

Indigenous arts include muay Thai (kick boxing), Thai dance, makruk (Thai Chess), Likay, and nang yai (shadow play).

Religion 

Thai form the second largest ethno-linguistic group among Buddhists in the world. The modern Thai are predominantly Theravada Buddhist and strongly identify their ethnic identity with their religious practices that include aspects of ancestor worship, among other beliefs of the ancient folklore of Thailand. Thais predominantly (more than 90%) avow themselves Buddhists. Since the rule of King Ramkhamhaeng of Sukhothai and again since the "orthodox reformation" of King Mongkut in the 19th century, it is modeled on the "original" Sri Lankan Theravada Buddhism. The Thais' folk belief however is a syncretic blend of the official Buddhist teachings, animistic elements that trace back to the original beliefs of Tai peoples, and Brahmin-Hindu elements from India, partly inherited from the Hindu Khmer Empire of Angkor.

The belief in local, nature and household spirits, that influence secular issues like health or prosperity, as well as ghosts (ผี) is widespread. It is visible, for example, in so-called spirit houses (san phra phum) that may be found near many homes. Phi play an important role in local folklore, but also in modern popular culture, like television series and films. "Ghost films" (nang phi) are a distinct, important genre of Thai cinema.

Hinduism has left substantial and present marks on Thai culture. Some Thais worship Hindu gods like Ganesha, Shiva, Vishnu, or Brahma (e.g., at Bangkok's well-known Erawan Shrine). They do not see a contradiction between this practice and their primary Buddhist faith. The Thai national epic Ramakien is an adaption of the Hindu Ramayana. Hindu mythological figures like Devas, Yakshas, Nagas, gods and their mounts (vahana) characterise the mythology of Thais and are often depicted in Thai art, even as decoration of Buddhist temples. Thailand's national symbol Garuda is taken from Hindu mythology as well.

A characteristic feature of Thai Buddhism is the practice of tham boon (ทำบุญ) ("merit-making"). This can be done mainly by food and in-kind donations to monks, contributions to the renovation and adornment of temples, releasing captive creatures (fish, birds), etc. Moreover, many Thais idolise famous and charismatic monks, who may be credited with thaumaturgy or with the status of a perfected Buddhist saint (Arahant). Other significant features of Thai popular belief are astrology, numerology, talismans and amulets (often images of the revered monks)

Besides Thailand's two   million Muslim Malays, there are an additional more than a million ethnic Thais who profess Islam, especially in the south, but also in greater Bangkok. As a result of missionary work, there is also a minority of approximately 500,000 Christian Thais: Catholics and various Protestant denominations. Buddhist temples in Thailand are characterized by tall golden stupas, and the Buddhist architecture of Thailand is similar to that in other Southeast Asian countries, particularly Cambodia and Laos, with which Thailand shares cultural and historical heritage.

See also 

 Ethnic groups in Thailand
 List of Thai actresses
 List of Thai actors
 List of Thai people
 Overseas Thai
 Peopling of Thailand
 Thai American
 Thai British
 Thai culture
 Thai folklore
 Thais in Hong Kong
 Thai marriage
 Thailand

Notes

References

Bibliography 
Girsling, John L.S., Thailand: Society and Politics (Cornell University Press, 1981).
Terwiel, B.J., A History of Modern Thailand (Univ. of Queensland Press, 1984).
Wyatt, D.K., Thailand: A Short History (Yale University Press, 1986).

External links 

US Library of Congress Country Studies, Thailand, The Thai and Other Tai-Speaking Peoples

 
Tai peoples
Ethnic groups in Thailand